Knutsford was a county constituency in Cheshire which returned one Member of Parliament (MP)  to the House of Commons of the Parliament of the United Kingdom from 1885 until it was abolished for the 1983 general election.

History 
Knutsford was first created as one of eight single-member divisions of Cheshire under the Redistribution of Seats Act 1885.

It was abolished following the reorganisation of local authorities in 1974 by the Third Periodic Review of Westminster constituencies for the 1983 general election, when it was divided primarily between Altrincham and Sale and the new constituencies of Congleton and Tatton.

Boundaries 
1885–1918: The Sessional Division of Bucklow, parts of the Sessional Divisions of Daresbury, Prestbury, Leftwich, Northwich, and Stockport, and the part of the Borough of Warrington in the county of Cheshire.

The seat was centred around the town of Knutsford and stretched from Daresbury to the west, Disley to the east, and Holmes Chapel to the south.

1918–1945: The Urban Districts of Alderley Edge, Bollington, Hazel Grove and Bramhall, Knutsford, and Wilmslow, and parts of the Rural Districts of Bucklow, Congleton, Macclesfield, Northwich, and Runcorn.

Gained Hazel Grove from Hyde and Bramhall from Altrincham.  Lost eastern fringe, including Disley, to Macclesfield.

1945–1950: The County Boroughs of Stockport (part) and Warrington (part)1, the Urban Districts of Alderley Edge (part), Bollington, Hazel Grove and Bramhall, Knutsford, Marple (part)1 and Wilmslow, and parts of the Rural Districts of Bucklow, Congleton, Macclesfield, Northwich, Runcorn and Warrington1.

1Trivial parts of electorate.

As part of an interim review of abnormally large constituencies (those exceeding an electorate of 100,000) in time for the 1945 election, the definition of the constituency's boundaries was altered to reflect changes in local authority boundaries. The only non-trivial adjustment to the electorate was to include the area comprising the former Urban District of Handforth, which had been absorbed into the Urban District of Wilmslow, transferred from the abolished Altrincham constituency.

1950–1955: The Urban Districts of Alderley Edge, Alsager, Bowdon, Hale, Knutsford, Sandbach and Wilmslow, and the Rural Districts of Bucklow and Congleton.

Major realignment of boundaries, losing eastern and western parts, whilst being extended to the north and south:

 Bollington and the part of the Rural District of Macclesfield, including Poynton, transferred to the constituency of Macclesfield;
 Hazel Grove and Bramhall included in the new constituency of Cheadle;
 Offerton (now part of the County Borough of Stockport) included in the new constituency of Stockport South;
 the parts of the Rural Districts of Northwich and Runcorn transferred to the respective constituencies of the same name;
 Alsager transferred from Crewe and Sandbach from Northwich, along with the parts of the Rural District of Congleton in both constituencies; and
 Bowdon, Hale and remaining parts of the Rural District of Bucklow transferred from the abolished constituency of Bucklow.

1955–1974: The Urban Districts of Alderley Edge, Bowdon, Hale, Knutsford, and Wilmslow, and the Rural Districts of Bucklow and Congleton.

Alsager and Sandbach transferred to Crewe.

1974–1983: The Urban Districts of Bowdon, Hale, and Knutsford, and the Rural Districts of Bucklow and Congleton.

Alderley Edge transferred to Macclesfield and Wilmslow to Cheadle.

From 1 April 1974 until the constituency was abolished at the next boundary review which came into effect for the 1983 general election, the constituency comprised parts of the newly formed Boroughs of Congleton, Macclesfield and Vale Royal in Cheshire, the City of Manchester (parish of Ringway) and the Borough of Trafford in Greater Manchester (Bowdon, Hale and the parishes of Carrington, Dunham Massey, Partington and Warburton), but its boundaries were unchanged.

On abolition, the constituency was broken up as follows:

 Bowdon and Hale, Dunham Massey and Warburton to Altrincham and Sale;
 Carrington and Warburton to the new constituency of Davyhulme;
 Ringway to Manchester Wythenshawe;
 southern parts, comprising the former Rural District of Congleton to the new constituency of Congleton; and 
 remaining parts, including Knutsford and surrounding rural areas to the new constituency of Tatton.

Members of Parliament

Elections

Elections in the 1880s

Elections in the 1890s

Elections in the 1900s

Elections in the 1910s

General Election 1914–15:

Another General Election was required to take place before the end of 1915. The political parties had been making preparations for an election to take place and by the July 1914, the following candidates had been selected; 
Unionist: Alan Sykes
Liberal: Philip Oliver

Elections in the 1920s

Elections in the 1930s 

General Election 1939–40:
Another General Election was required to take place before the end of 1940. The political parties had been making preparations for an election to take place and by the Autumn of 1939, the following candidates had been selected; 
Conservative: Ernest Makins
Liberal: Harold Heathcote-Williams

Elections in the 1940s

Elections in the 1950s

Elections in the 1960s

Elections in the 1970s

See also 

 History of parliamentary constituencies and boundaries in Cheshire

References 

Parliamentary constituencies in Cheshire (historic)
Constituencies of the Parliament of the United Kingdom established in 1885
Constituencies of the Parliament of the United Kingdom disestablished in 1983
Knutsford